People Will Talk was an American game show that aired on NBC from July 1 to December 27, 1963. The host was Dennis James, with Kenny Williams announcing. In 1964, packager Heatter-Quigley Productions revamped the program under the name The Celebrity Game, with host Carl Reiner at CBS Television City in Hollywood.

Game play
The object was to argue opposite sides of a question and try to find support of their opinions among a panel of fifteen celebrities. Two studio contestants competed against one another in arguing sides of a question, such as "Should a woman lie about her age?" resulting in either a yes or no answer. The contestants would state why they chose that side.

After hearing both sides of the story, the celebrity panel would then vote yes or no. After voting, contestants chose a celebrity that they thought agreed with their point of view. If the contestant and celebrity matched answers, the contestant won $25. If their points of view differed, the other contestant won the $25.

The first person to collect $100 won the game and merchandise prizes.

Pilot
The pilot was shot at CBS with Arthur Godfrey as host.

Episode status
The show is rumored to be destroyed (including the pilot) with the exception of one or two episodes.
1960s American game shows
1963 American television series debuts
1963 American television series endings
NBC original programming
Television series by Heatter-Quigley Productions
Television series by MGM Television
Television series by Four Star Television
Lost television shows